This Way is the debut album by Hana Pestle. The album was released on September 22, 2009, via Hanapestle.com, and iTunes through Ben Moody's label FNR Records.

MojoRadio.us calls This Way a journey where "Pestle's lyrics combine with an emotive and ethereal vocal style to evoke soul stirring memories. Her songs sway from brooding and moody, to inspiring and uplifting."

Track listing

Personnel
 Hana Pestle — lead vocals
 Marty O'Brien — bass
 Produced by Ben Moody and Michael Herring
 Strings arranged and conducted by David Campbell

References

2009 debut albums